Ladislav Štípek (1925 in Prague – 13 February 1998 in Barcelona) was a male international table tennis player from Czechoslovakia.

Table tennis career
From 1947 to 1959 he won some medals in team events in the Table Tennis European Championships and in the World Table Tennis Championships.

His 19 World Championship medals included five gold medals; two in the team event and three in the doubles with Bohumil Váňa and Ivan Andreadis respectively.

He also won an English Open title.

Personal life
He worked as an official for the Ninth of May Jawa motorcycle works.

See also
 List of table tennis players
 List of World Table Tennis Championships medalists

References

1925 births
1998 deaths
Czech male table tennis players
Czechoslovak table tennis players
Sportspeople from Prague